The manga series Prison School is written and illustrated by Akira Hiramoto. It began serialization in Kodansha's Weekly Young Magazine on February 7, 2011. Yen Press licensed the series in North America; who publishes the series in omnibus volumes containing two volumes each.


Volume list

References

External links
 

Lists of manga volumes and chapters